Fresh Meadow Country Club is a country club with a golf course in the eastern United States, located on Long Island in  its home since 1946. The club opened in the New York City borough of Queens in 1923, with a golf course designed by noted course architect , and hosted two major championships in the early 1930s.

Original site
The country club was named  for the Fresh Meadows neighborhood of Northeast Queens just south of Horace Harding Boulevard now the Long Island Expressway, near 183rd Street. The PGA Championship was held at Fresh Meadow Country Club in 1930, won by Tommy Armour, and the 1932 U.S. Open, won by its former club pro . (Sarazen was the runner-up in 1930, falling  in the 36-hole championship match to Armour.)

In 1937, the golf course hosted a charity game between John Montague, Babe Ruth, Babe Didrikson, and Sylvania Annenberg, a game that was watched by 10,000 fans, some of whom rushed the golf course and left Babe Ruth's shirt in tatters. In 1941, Ruth played Ty Cobb in a celebrity golf match at the course to benefit the USO, the second of three matches in three cities (Boston, New York, Detroit).

Lake Success
Under increasing development and tax pressure, the club sold its Queens property  in 1946, which was developed as a residential neighborhood (the Fresh Meadows section of Queens) by New York Life Insurance Company.

The club then purchased the property, clubhouse, and golf course of the defunct Lakeville Golf & Country Club in Nassau County, which is the club's present course. Approximately five miles (8 km) northeast of the original site, its course was designed by English course architect Charles Hugh Alison, partner of architect Harry Colt.

References

External links

1923 establishments in New York City
Golf clubs and courses in New York (state)
Golf clubs and courses designed by A. W. Tillinghast
Golf clubs and courses designed by Harry Colt
Sports venues completed in 1923
Sports venues in Nassau County, New York
Town of North Hempstead, New York